Vernon Gosdin (August 5, 1934 – April 28, 2009) was an American country music singer. He had 19 top-10 solo hits on the country music charts from 1977 through 1990. Three of these hits went to Number One: "I Can Tell By the Way You Dance (You're Gonna Love Me Tonight)", "Set 'Em Up Joe", and "I'm Still Crazy".

Career

Early years
As the sixth child in a family of nine, Vern Gosdin began singing in Bethel East Baptist Church in his birth place of Woodland, Alabama, United States, where his mother played piano. Gosdin and two brothers sang gospel on Birmingham radio station WVOK. Gosdin later moved to Chicago, Illinois, where he operated the D&G Tap. He idolized The Louvin Brothers and The Blue Sky Boys as a young man.

1960s: West Coast Country music movement
In 1961, Gosdin moved to California, where he joined the West Coast Country music movement, first as a member of the Golden State Boys, which became The Hillmen, and included Chris Hillman. Gosdin then formed The Gosdin Brothers with brother Rex. The duo appeared on the charts in the late 1960s with a song titled "Hangin' On" on the Bakersfield International label, then with "Till The End" on Capitol Records. During the same time period, the Gosdin Brothers were featured on Hillman's former Byrds mate Gene Clark's first solo album, the 1967 well-regarded Gene Clark with the Gosdin Brothers, singing backing vocals on all of the tracks behind the lead vocals of Clark and lead guitars of Clarence White, Glen Campbell, and Bill Rinehart (later of the Merry-Go-Round).

1970s: Retirement and comeback
Gosdin retired from performing during the 1970s and moved to Cartersville, Georgia, where he operated a glass company. In 1976, he signed with Elektra Records and his first hit was a remake of "Hangin' On", which featured Emmylou Harris on harmony vocals and peaked at No. 16. His next single, "Yesterday's Gone" written by Wayne Hinsen Bradford who also wrote for Emmylou Harris, which also featured Harris, became his first Top 10 hit in 1977. Several more hits followed between 1977 and 1979 with the biggest of these hits being a remake of "Till the End" and a cover of The Association's "Never My Love" which also featured harmony vocals from Janie Frickie.

1981–1983: "Today My World Slipped Away"
In 1981, Gosdin signed with Ovation Records and scored a Top 10 hit with "Dream of Me". After Ovation Records closed their doors later in 1981, Gosdin signed with A.M.I. Records where he scored a Top 10 hit in 1982 with "Today My World Slipped Away". (This song later became a number-three hit for George Strait).

In January 1982, during a trial that examined the attempted assassination of music producer Gary S. Paxton, Darryl C. Langley claimed under oath that he & his cohort were hired attackers employed by Gosdin, who worked closely with Paxton & was alleged to be disgruntled in their working relationship. Gosdin was never arrested or charged & repeatedly refused to confirm or deny involvement for the remainder of his life.

First released by Gosdin in 1983, "Tennessee Courage" was written by Louis Brown, Gosdin and Max D. Barnes. The song would also be recorded by Keith Whitley and many others over the years and is considered a favorite among fans of traditional country music. Barnes and Brown were both notable Nashville songwriters each with hundreds of songwriting credits; Barnes would eventually win over 42 songwriting awards in his career. Brown would go on to write as a staff writer for 'Tree Publishing' and 'Stoney Lonesome Music Publishing', both headquartered on Music Row in Nashville, Tennessee.

Gosdin, meanwhile, signed with Complete Records in the early 1980s, and, in 1984, released There Is A Season, picked by the Los Angeles Times as best country album of the year.
The early 1980s also found a great combination of talent as Gosdin traveled from coast to coast opening shows for George Jones.

1983–1985: "If You're Gonna Do Me Wrong (Do It Right)"' and There Is a Season
Gosdin made the top 10 consistently in the early 1980s, really hitting his stride when he teamed with Barnes as a songwriting collaborator. The pair specialized in songs of cheating and barroom romance, often delivering an over-the-top emotionalism that got Gosdin compared to George Jones. In 1983, Gosdin had two top 5 hits — "If You're Gonna Do Me Wrong (Do It Right)" and "Way Down Deep" with the former earning him a nomination for the Grammy Award for Best Country Vocal Performance, Male. The following year, he had his first No. 1 single with "I Can Tell by the Way You Dance (You're Gonna Love Me Tonight)", which had previously been recorded by Gary Morris. On September 22, 1985, Gosdin appeared at the original Farm Aid concert at the University of Illinois' Memorial Stadium.

1987–1989: "Chiseled in Stone"
After Compleat Records went bankrupt, Gosdin signed with Columbia in 1987. He immediately had success with "Do You Believe Me Now", and scored another No. 1 hit with a tribute to Ernest Tubb called "Set 'Em Up Joe". Gosdin's "Chiseled in Stone", co-written with Barnes, won the Country Music Association's Song of the Year award in 1989 and earned them a nomination for the Grammy Award for Best Country Song.

1989–1990: Alone
Gosdin's 1989 album, Alone, was a concept album in a traditional country style. It chronicled the dissolution of Gosdin's marriage and included his final number-one hit: "I'm Still Crazy". From 1989 to 1991, he released a number of songs and three more made the Billboard top 10: "Right in the Wrong Direction", "That Just About Does It" and "Is It Raining at Your House". "Raining" has been covered by Brad Paisley and Lorrie Morgan, and "That Just About Does It" by Willie Nelson.

Later years
Gosdin suffered a stroke in 1998, but he continued writing and singing up until his death. In 2009, Gosdin collaborated with Joe Sins of the country music duo The Sins to write and record his final four songs.

Death
Gosdin suffered another stroke in early April of 2009, and died at a Nashville hospital on the evening of April 28th at the age of 74. His remains were buried at Mount Olivet Cemetery in Nashville, Tennessee.

Discography

References

Bibliography
Hines, Geoffrey (1998). "Vern Gosdin". In The Encyclopedia of Country Music. Paul Kingsbury, Editor. New York: Oxford University Press. pp. 206–7.

External links
 CMT.com: Vern Gosdin
 Vern Gosdin remembrance in the Tripwire

1934 births
2009 deaths
American country singer-songwriters
American male singer-songwriters
People from Randolph County, Alabama
Elektra Records artists
Columbia Records artists
A&M Records artists
Ovation Records artists
20th-century American singers
Country musicians from Tennessee
Country musicians from Alabama
20th-century American male singers
Burials at Mount Olivet Cemetery (Nashville)
Singer-songwriters from Alabama
Singer-songwriters from Tennessee